was a train station located in Sanjō, Niigata, Japan.

Lines 

Japanese National Railways
Yahiko Line (Closed section)

History
The station was opened on July 31, 1927 and closed on April 1, 1985.

Railway stations in Niigata Prefecture
Defunct railway stations in Japan
Railway stations in Japan opened in 1927
Railway stations closed in 1985
1985 disestablishments in Japan